The Bristol Medico Chirurgical Society is a medical society in Bristol, England. It publishes a journal, The West of England Medical Journal, that was first published as the Bristol Medico Chirurgical Journal in 1883 and also as The Medical Journal of the South-West.

References

External links

Clubs and societies in based in Bristol
Medical associations based in the United Kingdom
1880s establishments in England